An army division or division ( or Fördelning) was during the 1900s in the Swedish Army a designation for a larger military unit, comprising two or more brigades, an artillery regiment, an engineer battalion, an anti-aircraft battalion, a signal battalion and a transport battalion. An arméfördelning corresponds to a division in many countries' armies, and it has been common to also use the word "division" in Swedish when referring to foreign rather than Swedish military units. The last divisions were disbanded through the Defence Act of 2000 and were replaced between 2000 and 2004 as a transition period of the 1st Mechanized Division (1. mekaniserade divisionen).

History

The concept of arméfördelning ("army division"), originally only fördelning ("division") began to be used after the beginning of the 19th century, and was introduced in 1889 as a term also in the peace-time organization. Through the 1892 and 1897 changes made in the organization of the army, the artillery was also placed under the commanding officers of the army divisions. An army division then, apart from some exceptions, consisted of four infantry, one cavalry and one artillery regiment, and one service corps, for which at war, engineer troops were added. The army division is intended for independent operations, but lacks complete administrative bodies in peacetime. Sweden was divided into six army division areas in 1904, with command offices in Helsingborg (1st), Linköping (2nd), Skövde (3rd), Stockholm (4th and 5th) and Härnösand (6th).

The army divisions replaced the peacetime subdivision of military districts that was used in the years 1833–1888. In 1889–1892, the territorial territory of the army division was called military district, but this was abolished from 1893 when the territorial territory of an army division was named army division area (arméfördelningsområde).

Through the Defence Act of 1942, the I-IV Military Districts came to mobilize two divisions each, while the V and VI Military Districts each mobilized one army division. On 1 October 1966, the Roman numerals in the designation of the army divisions was changed to Arabic numerals. Through the Defence Act of 1977, the army divisions were reduced by two staffs. Through 1988 Defense Investigation, the army divisions were reduced by two staffs. Through the Defence Act of 1996, the army divisions were reduced by three staffs, since the three military districts would mobilize one army division each. Through the Defence Act of 2000, the last three army divisions were disbanded, and replaced by the 1st Mechanized Division (1. mekaniserade divisionen).

Divisions

1893–1901
The 1893 subdivision was operational from 1 October of that year. From 1898, Roman numerals was used.

1902–1927
The 1902 subdivision was operational from 1 January of that year.

1928–1936
The 1928 subdivision was operational from 1 January of that year.

1937–1942
The 1937 subdivision was operational from 1 January of that year.

1943–1966
The 1943 subdivision was operational from 7 February of that year.

1966–1994

1994–2000

See also
 Military district (Sweden)

References

Notes

Print

Web

 List
Army